These are the summaries of the matches in the qualifying rounds for the group stage of the 2011 CAF Confederation Cup.

The schedule for the tournament was released in October 2010, and the draw for the first three rounds was held in Cairo on 20 December 2010. The draw for the play-off round (together with the draw for the group stage) was held in Cairo on 15 May 2010.

Qualification ties were decided over two legs, with aggregate goals used to determine the winner. If the sides were level on aggregate after the second leg, the away goals rule applied, and if still level, the tie proceeded directly to a penalty shootout (no extra time is played).

Preliminary round
This was a knock-out stage of the 40 teams that did not receive byes to the first round.

First legs: 28–30 January 2011; Second legs: 11–13 and 25–27 February 2011.

ASC Tevragh-Zeïna won 1–0 on aggregate and advanced to the first round.

Missile won 4–1 on aggregate and advanced to the first round.

AC Léopards won 3–1 on aggregate and advanced to the first round.

Touré Kunda Footpro won 4–3 on aggregate and advanced to the first round.

4–4 on aggregate; Al-Nasr won on penalties and advanced to the first round.

0–0 on aggregate; Sahel SC won on penalties and advanced to the first round.

Maghreb de Fès won 5–2 on aggregate and advanced to the first round.

Ashanti Gold won 2–0 on aggregate and advanced to the first round.

Foullah Edifice won 2–1 on aggregate and advanced to the first round.

0–0 on aggregate; Sofapaka won on penalties and advanced to the first round.

Nchanga Rangers advanced to the first round after Highlanders withdrew following the first leg.

1–1 on aggregate; AS Adema won on the away goals rule and advanced to the first round.

Wits won 4–1 on aggregate and advanced to the first round.

3–3 on aggregate; Difaa El Jadida won on the away goals rule and advanced to the first round.

 

USFA won 4–3 on aggregate and advanced to the first round.

Africa Sports won 2–1 on aggregate and advanced to the first round.

Tiko United won 3–1 on aggregate and advanced to the first round.

Motema Pembe won 6–0 on aggregate and advanced to the first round.

2–2 on aggregate; Victors won on penalties and advanced to the first round.

Dedebit won 6–4 on aggregate and advanced to the first round.

First round
This was a knock-out stage of 32 teams; the 20 teams advancing from the preliminary round, and 12 teams that received byes to this round.

First legs: 18–20 March 2011; Second legs: 1–3 April 2011.

JS Kabylie won 3–1 on aggregate and advances to the second round.

Missile won 3–2 on aggregate and advanced to the second round.

1º de Agosto won 2–1 on aggregate and advanced to the second round.

FUS Rabat won 3–2 on aggregate and advanced to the second round.

Al-Khartoum advanced to the second round after Al-Nasr withdrew. Tie was scheduled to be played over one leg due to the political situation in Libya, but match did not take place.

Maghreb de Fès won 2–1 on aggregate and advanced to the second round.

Etoile Sahel won 4–2 on aggregate and advanced to the second round.

Kaduna United won 2–1 on aggregate and advanced to the second round.

Sofapaka won 4–2 on aggregate and advanced to the second round.

Saint Eloi Lupopo won 3–0 on aggregate and advanced to the second round.

Note: First leg originally played on 20 March 2011 (kick-off 15:00 UTC+02:00), but abandoned after half-time with score 0–0 due to torrential rain, and replayed the next day.

AS Adema won 3–1 on aggregate and advanced to the second round.

Difaa El Jadida won 3–2 on aggregate and advanced to the second round.

USFA advanced to the second round after Africa Sports withdrew. Tie was scheduled to be played over one leg (at Accra, Ghana on 3 April 2011) due to the political situation in Côte d'Ivoire. but match did not take place.

Sunshine Stars won 3–0 on aggregate and advanced to the second round.

Motema Pembe won 2–1 on aggregate and advanced to the second round.

Haras El Hodood won 5–1 on aggregate and advanced to the second round.

Second round
This was a knock-out stage of the 16 teams that advanced from the first round; winners advanced to the play-off round, where they were joined by the eight losers from the CAF Champions League second round.

First legs: 22–24 April 2011; Second legs 6–8 May 2011.

3–3 on aggregate; JS Kabylie won on penalties and advanced to the play-off round.

1º de Agosto won 2–1 on aggregate and advanced to the play-off round.

Maghreb de Fès won 5–3 on aggregate and advanced to the play-off round.

Kaduna United advanced to the play-off round after being awarded the tie by CAF, as Etoile Sahel refused to travel to Nigeria for the first leg due to security concerns arising from rioting in the country following the 2011 Nigerian presidential election. First leg was scheduled to be played on 23 April 2011 in Abeokuta (moved from Kaduna by Kaduna United due to the rioting), but Etoile Sahel did not travel and asked the CAF for a postponement.

2–2 on aggregate; Sofapaka won on the away goals rule and advanced to the play-off round.

Difaa El Jadida won 3–1 on aggregate and advanced to the play-off round.

Sunshine Stars won 2–1 on aggregate and advanced to the play-off round.

3–3 on aggregate; Motema Pembe won on penalties and advanced to the play-off round.

Play-off round
This was a knock-out stage of 16 teams: the eight teams that advanced from the second round, and the eight teams that were eliminated in the CAF Champions League second round. In each tie, a winner from the Confederation Cup second round would play against a loser from the Champions League second round, with the Confederation Cup winner hosting the second leg at home. Moreover, the top-seeded Confederation Cup winner and the top-seeded Champions League loser would not be drawn against each other. Winners advanced to the group stage.

Winners from Confederation Cup second round
 JS Kabylie (top seed)
 1º de Agosto
 Motema Pembe
 Sofapaka
 Difaa El Jadida
 Maghreb de Fès
 Kaduna United
 Sunshine Stars

Losers from Champions League second round
 ES Sétif (top seed)
 Interclube
 ASEC Mimosas
 Al-Ittihad
 Diaraf
 Simba (loser of play-off due to disqualification of TP Mazembe)
 Club Africain
 ZESCO United

First legs: 27–29 May 2011; Second legs: 10–12 June 2011.

Kaduna United won 3–1 on aggregate and advanced to the group stage.

JS Kabylie won 3–1 on aggregate and advanced to the group stage.

Club Africain won 4–3 on aggregate and advanced to the group stage.

Sunshine Stars advanced to the group stage. Tie played over one leg due to the political situation in Libya.

Maghreb de Fès won 2–1 on aggregate and advanced to the group stage.

Motema Pembe won 2–1 on aggregate and advanced to the group stage.

ASEC Mimosas won 5–1 on aggregate and advanced to the group stage.

Interclube won 5–2 on aggregate and advanced to the group stage.

References

External links
CAF Confederation Cup

Qualifying rounds